Dhansiri Cadet School (DCS) is a private cadet school situated at Hemayetpur under Savar upazila of Dhaka District. DCS came into existence in 2012. Currently it accommodates students from class Play to Ten.

References

External links
Official website
Facebook

Schools in Dhaka District
Education in Savar